The 2011 San Diego Padres season was the 43rd season in franchise history.

2010–2011 Offseason
Adrián González would have been in the last year of his contract in 2011, but the Padres were not going to meet González's open market value especially with Jeff Moorad's purchase of the Padres from John Moores not completing until around 2013. On December 6, 2010, González was traded to the Boston Red Sox for a package of right-handed pitcher Casey Kelly, first baseman Anthony Rizzo, outfielder Reymond Fuentes, and a player to be named later, later determined to be Eric Patterson.

The Padres also acquired outfielder Cameron Maybin from the Florida Marlins for relievers Ryan Webb and Edward Mujica.

Jason Bartlett signed
Brad Hawpe signed
Orlando Hudson signed
Cameron Maybin acquired
Dustin Moseley signed
Chad Qualls signed
Aaron Harang signed
Jesús Guzmán signed

Among the players that left San Diego were:
Tony Gwynn Jr. who went to the Los Angeles Dodgers
Scott Hairston and Chris Young (pitcher) who both went to the New York Mets
Kevin Correia who went to the Pittsburgh Pirates
Yorvit Torrealba who went to the Texas Rangers
Miguel Tejada who went to the San Francisco Giants

Spring training

Game log
The Padres played at Peoria Sports Complex in Peoria, AZ.
The Padres' spring training schedule is on the website below.

Regular season

The Padres offense started the season being shut out seven times in April, a major league record according to the Elias Sports Bureau. Heath Bell converted his first seven save opportunities of the season, which tied him with Trevor Hoffman for the club record of 41 consecutive successful save conversions. The streak also tied him with Hoffman and Rod Beck for fourth-longest in MLB history. Bell blew his next save opportunity, a 3–0 lead, after he opened the ninth inning by walking the first two batters, and third baseman Chase Headley made a two-out, two-run throwing error to tie the game. On May 14, Bell recorded his 100th career save in a 9–7 win over the Colorado Rockies.

Mat Latos lost his first four starts, extending his losing streak to nine consecutive starts dating back to 2010. The streak ties the longest streak in Padres history, held by Andy Benes and Dennis Rasmussen. Latos had a no-decision in his next start after the bullpen blew a save opportunity, preventing him from earning a win. He would lose another decision for a 10-game losing streak that was one shy of the club record held by Gary Ross. Latos won on May 15 against the Colorado Rockies to
end his losing streak.

On June 20, former Padres first baseman Adrián González went 3 for 5 with a double and 3 RBI (all in the 10-run Boston 7th inning) in his first career game against San Diego in a 14–5 Red Sox victory in Fenway Park. The Padres were 6-9 in interleague play in 2011.

In May The San Diego Union-Tribune wrote that star minor league first baseman Anthony Rizzo's debut with the Padres might be delayed despite the club's hitting deficiencies due to cost considerations created by the "Super Two" exception for salary arbitration eligibility. The Padres cited Rizzo's lack of experience above Double-A and his limited exposure to left-handed pitching as benefits of his continuing to play in Tucson. He was called up to the majors after hitting .365 with 16 homers and 63 RBI in 200 at-bats in Tucson.
In his debut on June 9, against the Washington Nationals, Rizzo struck out in his first at bat, but then proceeded to hit a triple and score a run, helping the Padres to a 7–3 victory. He hit his first home run on June 11 against John Lannan. After three games he was 3-for-7 with a double, triple and a home run, while demonstrated patience in drawing four walks for a .667 on-base percentage (OBP).

The Padres' pitcher Cory Luebke was added to the rotation on June 22, 2011 as a previous 5-spot pitcher. Wade LeBlanc was optioned after a loss to the Red Sox. He went 5 innings and struck out 6 in his first start of 2011 in an eventual 4-1 win.

On July 9 against the Los Angeles Dodgers, Luke Gregerson entered the game in the ninth inning after Aaron Harang, Josh Spence, Chad Qualls, and Mike Adams combined to pitch eight innings without allowing a hit.  Gregerson retired the first two hitters before a double by Juan Uribe on a one ball and two strike count broke up the no hitter. Dioner Navarro then hit a single off Gregerson to score the winning run for the Dodgers. This was the closest the Padres have come to pitching a no-hitter since Steve Arlin in 1972. The Padres are the only team that has never pitched a no-hitter in their history.

Bell was the only Padre selected for the 2011 All-Star Game. With the team 12 games under .500 coming out of the All-Star break, general manager Jed Hoyer said the Padres would pursue a long-term contract with Bell if they did not get a desirable trade offer for him.

On July 22, Rizzo was demoted back to Triple-A, and Kyle Blanks was promoted. Rizzo had struggled with only a .143 batting average and 1 home run, striking out 36 times in 98 at-bats. Hoyer said Rizzo "worked hard, never made excuses, and endeared himself to his teammates" during his initial stint in the majors.

At the non-waiver trade deadline on July 31, Adams was traded to the Texas Rangers for a pair of young Double-A starting pitchers—right-hander Joe Wieland and left-hander Robbie Erlin. Also, Ryan Ludwick was traded to the Pittsburgh Pirates for a player to be named later or cash considerations. Adams had appeared in 33 of the Padres' first 46 wins with 23 holds as the setup man for Bell. Adams was 3-1 with a 1.13 ERA and opposing hitters were batting only .155 against him, striking out 49 times in 48 innings. Ludwick was hitting only .238, but he had 11 homers and 64 RBI and 42 runs scored and was accounting for 25.3 percent of the Padres' runs. By comparison, Adrián González accounted for 23.6 percent of the Padres' runs in 2010. Bell was not traded, but Hoyer admitted Bell's greatest value to the team might come as a free agent if Bell refuses salary arbitration in the offseason and signs elsewhere—the Padres would receive two first-round draft picks in June 2012 as compensation.

The Padres retired number 51 in honor of Trevor Hoffman's at Petco Park in a pre-game ceremony on August 21, 2011, against the Florida Marlins. The ceremony was patterned after the show This Is Your Life, featuring over 40 of Hoffman's former teammates and coaches. Brian Johnson, the lead singer on AC/DC's "Hells Bells", paid tribute in a video to Hoffman for "rocking the mound". In a nod to Hoffman's late father, Ed, the Padres presented Hoffman with a mint condition 1958 Cadillac convertible; his father loved driving his family in a convertible. For the National Anthem, the Padres played a video of Ed singing "The Star-Spangled Banner" at Fenway Park on Opening Day in 1981 when Trevor's brother, Glenn, was the starting shortstop for the Boston Red Sox. Following the ceremony, Bell blew a 3–2 lead against the Marlins after allowing a solo home run to Mike Cameron with two outs in the ninth. However, Nick Hundley hit a leadoff triple in the bottom of the ninth, and would eventually score on a Will Venable single. It was Hundley's fifth triple of the season, tying the Padres single season record for triples by a catcher set by Benito Santiago in 1990.  It was also Hundley's fourth triple in his last six games. After the game, Bell said, "I guess it's one of those things, on Trevor Hoffman day, only he should get the save, I guess."

The Padres finished with a 71–91 record while hitting a major league-low 91 home runs and finishing last in the National League (and next to last in MLB) in batting average (.237) and OPS (.653). They scored the third fewest runs in MLB. No player on their active roster in the season finale hit 10 major-league home runs in 2011. The team led the Major Leagues in stolen bases, and Cameron Maybin was the ninth player in Padres history to steal 40 bases. He hit .264 with nine home runs and 40 RBIs and was the Padres' nominee for the Hank Aaron Award. The Union-Tribune praised Maybin's defense and called his acquisition "[o]ne of the best trades in Padres history" and named him the team's MVP. The Union-Tribune also wrote that Jesús Guzmán's line-drive hitting style was perfectly suited to the Padres' home at Petco Park, and he emerged as the team's best hitter. However, the Padres were shut out 19 times during the season. Hitting coach Randy Ready was fired after the end of the season. Since moving to Petco Park in 2004, the Padres have fired four hitting coaches, and another resigned.

Season standings

Record vs. opponents

Roster

Farm system 

LEAGUE CHAMPIONS: San Antonio, Lake Elsinore

References

External links

2011 San Diego Padres schedule at MLB.com
2011 San Diego Padres Statistics at Baseball-Reference.com

San Diego Padres seasons
San Diego Padres
2011 in sports in California